The following is a list of the television networks and announcers that have broadcast the Major League Soccer All-Star Game.

2020s

Notes
The 2021 game was originally scheduled to take place on July 29, 2020, during the 2020 season, but was postponed on May 19, 2020 due to the COVID-19 pandemic. The game was televised domestically on Fox Sports 1 and Univision in the United States, and on TSN and TVA Sports in Canada.

2010s

2000s

Notes
Former CBC affiliate, then E! and now CityTV affiliate CHAT-TV in Medicine Hat, Alberta did not air the 2008 game, because of Calgary CBC station CBRT-TV, as well as online through live streaming on the CBC Sports website.

In August 2006, MLS and ESPN announced an eight-year contract spanning 2007–2014, giving the league its first rights-fee agreement worth $8 million annually. This deal gave league a regular primetime slot on Thursdays, televised coverage of the first round of the MLS SuperDraft, and an expanded presence on other ESPN properties such as ESPN360 (now ESPN3) and Mobile ESPN. The agreement also placed each season's opening match, All-Star Game, and MLS Cup on ABC.

Bad weather at RFK Stadium in Washington, D.C. led to a 57 minute long rain delay in the first half of the 2002 game. Consequently, because ABC had to broadcast World News Tonight at 6:00 p.m. Eastern Time, the rest of the game was switched over to ESPN.

1990s

Notes
The entire 1999 game was aired to ESPN2 as ABC aired a special news report on the search for John F. Kennedy Jr.'s missing plane.

On March 15, 1994, Major League Soccer with ESPN and ABC Sports announced the league's first television rights deal without any players, coaches, or teams in place. The three-year agreement committed 10 games on ESPN, 25 on ESPN2, and the MLS Cup on ABC. The deal gave MLS no rights fees but split advertising revenue between the league and networks.

See also
Major League Soccer on television
MLS Primetime Thursday
MLS Game of the Week
Viernes de Fútbol
List of current Major League Soccer broadcasters
List of MLS Cup broadcasters
List of ESPN Major League Soccer personalities

References

External links
MLS ALL-STAR GAME HISTORY
A (Uni) History of the MLS All-Star Game
TV Ratings: MLS 
Episode List: MLS All-Star Game - TV Tango

All-Star Game
ABC Sports
CBC Sports
ESPN announcers
Fox Sports announcers
The Sports Network
UniMás original programming
Broadcasters
Wide World of Sports (American TV series)
All-Star Game